Howard Leslie Elliott (10 March 1877 – 11 November 1956) was a New Zealand Baptist minister, sectarian agitator and editor. He was born in Maldon, Victoria, Australia on 10 March 1877.

He moved to New Zealand in 1909 where he was the pastor of the Mount Eden Baptist Church. In July 1917 he resigned his pastorate and founded the Protestant Political Association of New Zealand (PPA). In the 1919 and 1922 elections the PPA endorsed most of the New Zealand Reform Party's candidates.

In 1930 he founded the New Zealand Financial Times. In the 1943 election he publicly endorsed John A. Lee's Democratic Labour Party.

Howard Elliott died in Te Awamutu on 11 November 1956.

References

1877 births
1956 deaths
New Zealand writers
People from Maldon, Victoria
New Zealand Baptist ministers
New Zealand Labour Party (1910) politicians
Reform Party (New Zealand) politicians
Democratic Labour Party (New Zealand) politicians
New Zealand activists
Australian emigrants to New Zealand